Yony Flores  (born 16 February 1983 in Guatemala City) is a former Guatemalan football defender who last played for CSD Municipal in the Liga Nacional de Guatemala.

Club career
Flores started his career at Sacachispas. He joined Deportivo Marquense before signing up for CSD Municipal on 16 June 2009.

Match fixing allegations and suspension
On May 27, 2012, Flores was separated from the Guatemala National Team on basis of suspected to arrange a match result of Guatemala against South Africa in 2010. In June 2012, this was confirmed by teammates, Luis Rodriguez and Carlos Ruiz.

Flores, along with Guillermo Ramirez and Gustavo Adolfo Cabrera, was found guilty by the National Football Federation of Guatemala in September 2012 of conspiring to fix a pair of national team exhibitions and a CONCACAF Champions League game between CSD Municipal and Mexico's Santos Laguna. The trio played together at Municipal in the fall of 2010, when the club finished behind Santos and the Columbus Crew in its first-round group.

Banned from the sport inside their native country, the players saw their exile extended worldwide on Wednesday.

International career
Flores made his debut for Guatemala in a February 2007 UNCAF Nations Cup match against El Salvador and, as of January 2010, earned 20 caps, scoring no goals, including seven qualifying matches for the 2010 FIFA World Cup. He was part of the squad for the 2007 CONCACAF Gold Cup, but did not make any appearances. In 2011, Flores scored a goal in an 2014 FIFA World Cup qualification match against Saint Vincent and the Grenadines

International goals

Personal life
Flores is married to Johanna de Flores and they have a daughter named Catherine.

References

External links
 
 Player profile - LaRed Deportiva 

1983 births
Living people
People from Chiquimula Department
Association football defenders
Guatemalan footballers
Guatemala international footballers
2007 UNCAF Nations Cup players
2007 CONCACAF Gold Cup players
2009 UNCAF Nations Cup players
2011 Copa Centroamericana players
Deportivo Marquense players
C.S.D. Municipal players
Sportspeople involved in betting scandals
Sportspeople banned for life